Sara Cone Bryant (1873May 28, 1956) was an American lecturer, teacher, and writer. She wrote children's books in the early 20th century. She also supported and took a leadership role in women's suffrage.

Early life and education

Sara Cone Bryant was born in Melrose, Massachusetts, in 1873. Her parents were Dexter and Dorcas Ann (Hancock) Bryant. Siblings included brothers Albert and Wallace.

She attended the grammar and high schools of the town, being graduated from Melrose High School in 1891 as valedictorian. The last two years of her course, she was editor of the high school paper.

Entering Boston University in the fall of 1891, Bryant at once became interested in the college paper, the University Beacon, and became a regular contributor to its pages. In her sophomore year, she was elected associate editor of the paper, and took charge of the department of college verse. At the same time, Bryant contributed largely to the newspapers, and was a frequent speaker at the women's clubs of Boston. For three years, she held leading roles in the annual French plays of the university. She was also elected by her class to the position of poet for the class day exercises. Bryant was awarded the inaugural Willard scholarship for excellence in modern languages, which gave her a year's study abroad. She graduated with B.A. in 1895, and was a member of the Kappa Kappa Gamma sorority. Her research abroad supported the study of sociology and modern languages. In 1896, she was a student of kindergarten methods in Berlin.

Career

During the period of 1897-1900, and again later in life, Bryant wrote for various newspapers and magazines. Her children's stories included examples of humorous tales, hero stories, fables, construction stories, and fairy tales.

She was the co-founder of the College Equal Suffrage League, and in 1901, served as its president, contending that every person in the United States should have equal rights, labors and privileges.

From 1904 until 1906, she served as instructor in English and lecturer on English poetry in Simmons College.  In 1907, she was a lecturer on story-telling in the Lucy Wheelock Kindergarten in Boston, 1907.

Personal life and death
On March 9, 1908, she married Theodore Franz Borst, a horticulturalist, and appears with her husband in the 1940 census. They had two children. Her brother, Albert Bryant, ran The Centaur Company and Sterling Products which later became Sterling Drug and his father-in-law was Charles Henry Fletcher.

Bryant died in Framingham, Massachusetts, on May 28, 1956.

Selected works

Books

How to Tell Stories To Children, 1905
Stories to tell the littlest ones
Epaminondas and His Auntie
I Am an American, 1918
The Burning Rice Fields
Fifty-one Stories to Tell to Children
Best Stories to Tell to Children, 1912 
Gordon and His Friends, 1924

Stories
 Humorous tales
 "The Story of Epaminondas"
 "The Little Jackal and the Alligator"
 "The Talkative Tortoise"
 "The Cat and the Parrot"
 Hero stories
 "Little Hero of Haarlem" 
 Fables 
 "The Wind and the Sun"
 Constructive stories 
 "The Gingerbread Man" 
 "Who Killed the Otter's Babies?"
 Fairy tales 
 "The Adventures of the Little Field Mouse" 
 "The Shoemaker and the Elves

References

Attribution

External links 
 
 
 

1873 births
1956 deaths
American children's writers
20th-century American writers
20th-century American women writers
Boston University alumni
People from Melrose, Massachusetts
Writers from Massachusetts
Educators from Massachusetts
Simmons University faculty
American women academics